List of modern weapons of the Brazilian Air Force is a list of in service and active weapon systems of the Brazilian Air Force.

Surface-to-air missile

Anti-tank missiles

Anti-ship missiles

Anti-radiation missile

Targeting pod

Cruise missile

Air to air missile

Bombs

Rockets

Torpedoes

Automatic cannons

Machine guns

See also
List of active Brazilian military aircraft

References

External links
 Brazilian Air Force website 

 
Weapons of Brazil